Psorophora is a genus of mosquitoes, containing these species:

Psorophora albigenu
Psorophora albipes
Psorophora amazonica
Psorophora champerico
Psorophora ciliata
Psorophora cilipes
Psorophora cingulata
Psorophora circumflava
Psorophora columbiae
Psorophora confinnis
Psorophora cyanescens
Psorophora dimidiata
Psorophora discolor
Psorophora discrucians
Psorophora ferox
Psorophora fiebrigi
Psorophora forceps
Psorophora goeldii
Psorophora holmbergii
Psorophora horrida
Psorophora howardii
Psorophora infinis
Psorophora insularia
Psorophora jamaicensis
Psorophora johnstonii
Psorophora lanei
Psorophora leucocnemis
Psorophora lineata
Psorophora longipalpus
Psorophora lutzii
Psorophora marmorata
Psorophora mathesoni
Psorophora melanota
Psorophora mexicana
Psorophora ochripes
Psorophora pallescens
Psorophora paulli
Psorophora perterrens
Psorophora pilipes
Psorophora pilosus
Psorophora pruinosa
Psorophora pseudoalbipes
Psorophora pseudomelanota
Psorophora pygmaea
Psorophora saeva
Psorophora santamarinai
Psorophora signipennis
Psorophora stonei
Psorophora totonaci
Psorophora varinervis
Psorophora varipes

References

Aedini
Mosquito genera
Taxa named by Jean-Baptiste Robineau-Desvoidy